José Antonio Ríos Reina (born 10 May 1990 in Seville, Andalusia) is a Spanish footballer who plays as a left back for SD Eibar.

External links

1990 births
Living people
Footballers from Seville
Spanish footballers
Association football defenders
Segunda División players
Segunda División B players
Sevilla Atlético players
Real Madrid Castilla footballers
CD Mirandés footballers
UE Costa Brava players
SD Ponferradina players
SD Eibar footballers
Cypriot First Division players
Anorthosis Famagusta F.C. players
Spain youth international footballers
Spanish expatriate footballers
Expatriate footballers in Cyprus